Yézoumi Akogo is an agricultural scientist from Togo, who attended the National University of Benin. Her research examines the in vitro propagation of plants utilised in market gardening, tubers and medicinal plants. In 2000 she was awarded a L’Oréal-UNESCO Women in Science Fellowship, which enables recipients to fund field research. Akogo has worked on the in vitro propagation of okra, as well as models for experimental plant morphogenesis.

References 

Togolese scientists
Women botanists
University of Benin (Nigeria) alumni
Living people
Year of birth missing (living people)
21st-century Togolese people